The 2001 NACRA Rugby Championship was a rugby union championship for Tier 3 North American and Caribbean teams, which took place between 20 and 24 November 2001.

The tournament was also valid as the first round of Americas qualification for 2003 Rugby World Cup.

The championship was held as single-elimination tournament. The tournament was won by Trinidad and Tobago who beat Bermuda in the finals.

First round

Semifinals

Gold (1st-4th places)

Plate (5th-8th places)

Finals

5th place final

3rd place final

1st place final

See also
 NACRA Rugby Championship

References

External links 
 Details 

2001
2001 rugby union tournaments for national teams
2001 in North American rugby union
rugby union
rugby union
2001 in the Cayman Islands